Sir Colman Rashleigh, 2nd Baronet  (4 May 1819 – 27 October 1896) was an English Liberal Party politician.

Early life
Rashleigh was born on 4 May 1819 at Rickmansworth in Hertfordshire, England.  He was the eldest son of the former Harriet Williams (d. 1831) and Sir John Colman Rashleigh, 1st Baronet (1772–1847), who was created a Baronet of Prideaux on 30 September 1831 when Colman was 12 years old. 

His paternal grandparents were Katherine (née Battie) Rashleigh (daughter and co-heir of William Battie, Esq. M.D.) and John Rashleigh, Esq. of Penquite, the first Commissioner and Receiver for Greenwich Hospital. The Rashleigh family had been settled in Cornwall since at least the early part of the 16th century.  His maternal grandfather was Robert Williams, Esq. of Bridehead in County Durham MP.

Rashleigh was educated at Eton and Trinity College, Cambridge, graduating with a B.A. in 1843.

Career
Rashleigh held a number of public offices in Cornwall including a Justice of the Peace (JP), Deputy Lieutenant of Cornwall, High Sheriff of Cornwall in 1852 and Deputy-Warden of the Stannaries. He was a Member of Parliament (MP) for East Cornwall from 1874 to 1880.

He was also invested as a Companion, Order of the Bath (CB) and gained the rank of Honorary Colonel in the service of the Cornwall and Devon Miners' Artillery.

Personal life
On 1 May 1845, Rashleigh married Mary Anne Kendall (1823–1893), the only daughter of Nicholas Kendall of Pelyn MP and Mary Anne Wymond. Her brother was the Rev. Francis Kendall of Lanlivery. Together, they had four children:

 Sir Colman Battie Rashleigh, 3rd Baronet (1846–1907), who married, firstly, Geraldine Frances Walpole, daughter of Lt. Gen. Sir Robert Walpole, in 1872.  He married, secondly, Amy Young Jamieson, daughter of James Young Jamieson, Esq., in 1878.
 Reverend John Kendall Rashleigh (1847–1933), the Rector of St Mabyn in Cornwall who married, firstly, Charlotte Jane Rashleigh, daughter of Charles Edward Rashleigh, in 1871. He married, secondly, Charlotte Maria Hodgson, daughter of Sir Arthur Hodgson, in 1876.
 Harriett Rashleigh (b. )
 Mary Rashleigh (1852–1900), who married her brother's brother-in-law, Col. Henry James Young Jamieson, son of James Young Jamieson.

In 1851 he resided at Great Prideane, Luxulyan, Cornwall. Lady Rashleigh died at the Mayoralty in Bodmin on 6 August 1893 and Sir Colman died on 27 October 1896.

References

External links
 

1819 births
1896 deaths
Baronets in the Baronetage of the United Kingdom
Companions of the Order of the Bath
Deputy Lieutenants of Cornwall
High Sheriffs of Cornwall
Liberal Party (UK) MPs for English constituencies
Members of the Parliament of the United Kingdom for constituencies in Cornwall
UK MPs 1874–1880
Colman